Svadhya is a rāgam in Carnatic music (musical scale of South Indian classical music). It is an audava Shadava rāgam . It is a janya rāgam (derived scale), as it does not have all the seven swaras (musical notes).

It is said to evoke intense self-reflection to the listener and Karuṇa rasa (pathos).

Structure and Lakshana

 : 
 : 
(notes used in this scale are shuddha rishabham, shuddha madhyamam, panchamam, shuddha dhaivatham, kaisiki nishadham)

Svadhya is considered a janya rāgam of Ratnangi, the 2nd Melakarta rāgam. This Raga was created by composer Rajan Somasundaram.

Popular compositions
Here are some popular kritis composed in Svadhya.

Maya- The Reflection of Self by Rajan Somasundaram
Ashtavakra Gita- Self Realization Musical by Rajan Somasundaram

Related rāgams
This section covers the theoretical and scientific aspect of this rāgam.

Scale similarities
Revati ragam has similar aurohana but a different avarohana, especially the presence of shuddha dhaivatham makes Svadhya raga a complex one and lends a different color.

Notes

References

Janya ragas